Donald John McMahon (January 4, 1930 – July 22, 1987) was a right-handed relief pitcher in Major League Baseball. Born in Brooklyn, New York, he was signed by the Boston Braves before the 1950 season. He played for the Milwaukee Braves (1957–62), Houston Colt .45s (1962–63), Cleveland Indians (1964–66), Boston Red Sox (1966–67), Chicago White Sox (1967–68), Detroit Tigers (1968–69), and San Francisco Giants (1969–74).

McMahon was used almost exclusively in relief during his 18-year major league career. He appeared in 874 games, just two as a starter, and was one of the busiest and most dependable relievers of his era. He never was on the disabled list, and in the fifteen full seasons that he played (1958–72), he averaged about 54 games and 81 innings pitched per year.

Career
He reached the big leagues at the advanced age of 27 after playing minor league ball for about  years and spending two years in the military (May 30, 1951 – May 17, 1953). He appeared in his final game on June 29, 1974, nearly 17 years after his major league debut.

McMahon was a valuable part of two World Championship clubs—the 1957 Milwaukee Braves and the 1968 Detroit Tigers. He posted a 1.54 earned run average with 9 saves in 32 games for the Braves in 1957 and a 2.02 earned run average with a 3–1 record in 20 games for the Tigers in 1968 after a mid-season trade from the White Sox. All together he pitched in three World Series and one National League Championship Series.

He finished in the American League or National League top ten seven times for games pitched, seven times for saves, eight times for games finished, and once each for wild pitches, hit batsmen, and winning percentage.

Tommy John, McMahon's teammate on the Indians, described the pitcher as "a nail-tough, confident-bordering-on-cocky, Brooklyn-born veteran."

He recorded his 1000th strikeout at the age of 44 on May 27, 1974 on All-Star shortstop Don Kessinger of the Chicago Cubs. A little more than a month later, when McMahon retired, only Hoyt Wilhelm, Lindy McDaniel, and Cy Young had pitched in more games.

For his career he finished with a lifetime record of 90–68, 153 saves, 506 games finished, and an earned run average of 2.96. As of the conclusion of the 2006 season, McMahon ranked 17th all-time for fewest hits allowed per 9 innings pitched (7.24).

Other career highlights include:
Named to National League All-Star team (1958)
His final game, at the age of 44 (by far the oldest player in Major League Baseball at that time), 2 scoreless innings against the Los Angeles Dodgers (June 29, 1974)
Held Hall of Famers Hank Aaron, Ernie Banks, Johnny Bench, Harmon Killebrew, Bill Mazeroski, Joe Morgan, Stan Musial, Brooks Robinson, Frank Robinson, and Willie Stargell to a .149 collective batting average (28-for-188)

Coaching
McMahon served as Giants pitching coach from 1972 to 1975, and also from 1980 to 1982. He was activated by San Francisco for parts of the 1972, 1973, and 1974 seasons when the Giants needed his experienced and effective arm to help out in the bullpen. (Relievers Elías Sosa and Randy Moffitt were shouldering most of the load, and were not getting enough help from the others.) He also was the pitching coach of the Minnesota Twins from 1976 to 1977 and the Cleveland Indians from 1983 to 1985. In 1986, after a recommendation from friend and fellow high school classmate Al Davis, he was hired as a scout for the LA Dodgers.

Death
In 1987, he was working as an instructional coach and scout with the Los Angeles Dodgers and pitched batting practice before most home games. On July 22, he was pitching batting practice when he suffered a heart attack, having undergone heart bypass surgery about three and a half years prior. McMahon died within hours. He was buried at the Good Shepherd Cemetery in Huntington Beach, California, with a baseball in his hand. Don had several children with his wife Darlene, including his son Jack and Mike McMahon. At the time of Mr. McMahon's death the family lived in Garden Grove, California.

See also
 List of Major League Baseball annual saves leaders

References

External links

 Baseball Almanac
 Retrosheet

1930 births
1987 deaths
Atlanta Crackers players
Baseball players from New York (state)
Boston Red Sox players
Burials in Orange County, California
Chicago White Sox players
Cleveland Indians coaches
Cleveland Indians players
Denver Bears players
Detroit Tigers players
Erasmus Hall High School alumni
Evansville Braves players
Houston Colt .45s players
Los Angeles Dodgers scouts
Major League Baseball pitchers
Major League Baseball pitching coaches
Milwaukee Braves players
Minnesota Twins coaches
National League All-Stars
Owensboro Oilers players
San Francisco Giants coaches
San Francisco Giants players
Sportspeople from Brooklyn
Baseball players from New York City
Toledo Sox players
Wichita Braves players